The Brethren is a legal thriller novel by American author John Grisham, published in 2000.

Plot
The "Brethren" are three former judges who are incarcerated at Trumble, a fictional federal minimum security prison located in northern Florida. The trio embark on a scam to deceive and exploit wealthy closeted gay men. None of them are gay, but they write convincingly as two young vulnerable gay men, developing friendships and then asking for financial help. In some cases, they also try blackmail.  

With the help of their lawyer, Trevor Carson, they transfer their ill-gotten money to a secret Bahamian bank account. Carson takes one-third and employs private detectives to investigate the victims of the scam. This takes over from Carson's normal legal business, which had been making very little money for him.

Meanwhile, Teddy Maynard, the ruthless and soon-to-retire director of the CIA, is orchestrating a scheme to tip the United States presidential election in the favor of Aaron Lake, a hawkish congressman supported by arms manufacturers. However, Lake, who is closeted, is hooked by the unwitting Brethren in their scam. Realizing that Lake stands to be exposed, Maynard scrambles to stop them from finding out the truth. After the Brethren fire Carson, he is killed by CIA agents in the Caribbean.

The CIA plant a man inside Trumble, who tells the Brethren that he knows about the scam. A deal is worked out, money changes hands and the judges are pardoned by the outgoing president at Maynard's insistence. The judges leave the country and travel to Europe, where they later restart the scam. Meanwhile, Lake is elected and Maynard, eager to finish the cover-up, selects for him a suitable First Lady.

See also
 Badger game

2000 novels
Novels by John Grisham
Fictional con artists
Fictional judges
Novels about elections
Novels set in Florida
Doubleday (publisher) books
Federal American minimum security prisons in fiction